David Michael Draiman (born March 13, 1973) is an American singer and songwriter. Noted for his distorted, operatic, baritone voice and percussive singing style, he is best known as the lead vocalist of the heavy metal band Disturbed since 1996. He has written some of the band's most successful singles, such as "Stupify", "Down with the Sickness", "Indestructible", and "Inside the Fire". In 2006, he was ranked at No. 42 on the Hit Parader list of "Top 100 Metal Vocalists of All Time". During Disturbed's hiatus from 2011 to 2015, he worked on an industrial metal project with Geno Lenardo, which was later named Device. They released one self-titled album in 2013. Disturbed returned with the album Immortalized in 2015 and Evolution in 2018.

Early life 

David Michael Draiman was born to Jewish parents in the Brooklyn borough of New York City on March 13, 1973. His father, YJ, had worked as a real estate developer and small-business owner before he was arrested for embezzlement and sent to prison when Draiman was 12 years old. YJ would later become a candidate in the races for Mayor of Los Angeles in 2013, 2017, and 2022. Draiman's brother, Benjamin, is an ambient musician who lives in Israel. His grandmother Ziona is a Yemenite Jew whose family immigrated to Israel  in the early 1900s.

While not personally observant of their Jewish faith, Draiman's parents sent him to Orthodox schools, where he believed he was on the path to receiving rabbinic ordination. He frequently spent time in Israel during his early life. He attended five Jewish day schools, including Valley Torah High School in Los Angeles, where he formed his first band; Fasman Yeshiva High School in Skokie Illinois, a near north suburb of Chicago; and the Wisconsin Institute for Torah Study in Milwaukee. During his freshman year at the latter, he was asked to leave as he "rebelled against the conformity" and "just wanted to be a normal teenage kid", adding that he "couldn't really stomach the rigorous religious requirements of the life [there]". He has admitted to being "a bit resentful" about his time at Jewish day schools, but nevertheless became trained as a hazzan (cantor) and encouraged his family to observe Shabbat.

Draiman later enrolled at Ida Crown Jewish Academy in Chicago, and graduated from high school in 1991. From 1991 to 1992, he became romantically involved with a girl who used heroin and eventually killed herself, which would inspire the Disturbed song "Inside the Fire". At the age of 18, on New Year's Day 1992, he attempted to kill himself but says that he instead woke up later to find himself nearly frozen to death underneath a parked 1972 Oldsmobile Cutlass. After detoxing, he described having a "moment of clarity" and never used heroin again. After high school, he spent a year studying at the Yeshivas Neveh Zion in Kiryat Ye'arim on the outskirts of Jerusalem.

After returning to the U.S. in 1992, Draiman commenced pre-law studies at Loyola University Chicago. In 1996, he graduated with a BA in Political Science and Government, Philosophy, and Business Administration. Initially considering offers to study at law school, he realized that criminal defense law was the only area of law that interested him, which made him unwilling to pursue law because he knew he would not be able to "really look at [himself] in the mirror and say 'I'm going to lie for a living and protect criminals'". During his university studies, he also worked as a bank teller and in phone sales. After graduating, he worked as an administrative assistant in a healthcare facility. A year later, he earned an administrator's license and ran his own healthcare facility for five years before joining Disturbed. Leaving that position strained his relationship with his grandfather, who was a traditional Hasidic Jew.

Career 

Draiman became the lead vocalist of the heavy metal band Disturbed when its original lead singer left in 1996, two years after it had been formed under a different name. He auditioned and was asked to join the band after answering an advertisement the other members had placed in a local music publication in Chicago, which he later revealed was one of around 20 auditions for other bands he had attended that month. Guitarist Dan Donegan said of Draiman's audition, "You know, out of all the singers that we had talked to or auditioned, he was the only singer who was ready to go with originals. And that impressed me, just to attempt that. After a minute or two, he just starts banging out these melodies that were huge... I'm playing my guitar and I'm grinning from ear to ear. [...] I was so psyched. Chill up my spine."

Draiman has written some of Disturbed's most successful singles, such as "Stupify", "Down with the Sickness", "Indestructible", and "Inside the Fire". In 2006, he was ranked at No. 42 on the Hit Parader list of "Top 100 Metal Vocalists of All Time".

During Disturbed's hiatus from 2011 to 2015, Draiman worked on an industrial metal project with Geno Lenardo, which was later named Device. They released one self-titled album in 2013. Disturbed returned with the album Immortalized in 2015 and Evolution in 2018.

Artistry 

Draiman has said of his influences, "The first record I ever bought was Kiss' Destroyer. And those classic bands like Black Sabbath were my first loves. [...] I focused on the seminal metal bands like Metallica, Iron Maiden, Pantera and Queensrÿche. But I could also appreciate the hair metal bands – When you hear Whitesnake, you can't deny their greatness.  Then I went in the direction of punk and new wave, groups like the Sex Pistols, The Ramones, The Misfits and later The Smiths and The Cure – that was my '80s. [...] And then when the grunge revolution happened, it was like a wakeup call. I'll never forget getting my first Nirvana, Soundgarden and Alice in Chains records."

Personal life 

On September 25, 2011, Draiman married model and actress Lena Yada. Their son was born in September 2013. He was born three weeks premature, and the birth took 23 hours of labor.

Besides English, Draiman is also fluent in Hebrew.

Draiman said of his political views in 2015, "I'm liberal about everything that is issue-based as far as ideology, but I'm also of the opinion of a very small government. I don't agree with the fiscal policies of the Democrats, but I certainly don't agree with the right-wing craziness of the Republicans." He supported Bernie Sanders' 2016 presidential campaign. He has also described himself as "a very, very strong supporter of Israel forever and for our people". In 2019, he described Pink Floyd member Roger Waters and other activists seeking to boycott Israel for human rights abuses as "Nazi comrades".

Discography 

Disturbed
The Sickness (2000)
Believe (2002)
Ten Thousand Fists (2005)
Indestructible (2008)
Asylum (2010)
The Lost Children (2011)
Immortalized (2015)
Evolution (2018)
Divisive (2022)

Device
Device (2013)

Guest appearances 
"Forsaken" (written by Jonathan Davis) (2002)
"Here's to Us" (guest version) (2012)
"Dance in the Rain" (guest vocals for Megadeth) (2013)
"We Believe" (guest vocals for Hyro the Hero) (2020)
"King of Misery" (co-written with Saul) (2020)
"Dead Inside" (guest vocals for Nita Strauss) (2021) – No. 1 Mainstream Rock Songs

As producer
 Trivium – Vengeance Falls (2013)

References

External links 

Official Disturbed website

1973 births
American heavy metal singers
20th-century American singers
21st-century American singers
American health care businesspeople
American people of Yemeni-Jewish descent
American people of Israeli descent
American Ashkenazi Jews
American Mizrahi Jews
American Zionists
Businesspeople from Chicago
Businesspeople from New York City
Disturbed (band) members
Israeli Jews
Jewish American musicians
Jewish singers
Living people
Loyola University Chicago alumni
Musicians from Brooklyn
Nu metal singers
Singers from Chicago
Singers from New York City
American baritones
Jewish heavy metal musicians
Device (metal band) members